Eirene (Ëirene,  "Peace"), more commonly known in English as Peace, was one of the Horae, the personification of peace. She was depicted in art as a beautiful young woman carrying a cornucopia, sceptre, and a torch or rhyton. She is said sometimes to be the daughter of Zeus and Themis and sister of Dike and Eunomia. Her Roman equivalent was Pax.

Eirene was particularly well regarded by the citizens of Athens. After a naval victory over Sparta in 375 BC, the Athenians established a cult for Peace, erecting altars to her. They held an annual state sacrifice to her after 371 BC to commemorate the Common Peace of that year and set up a votive statue in her honour in the Agora of Athens. The statue was executed in bronze by Cephisodotus the Elder, likely the father or uncle  of the famous sculptor Praxiteles. It was acclaimed by the Athenians, who depicted it on vases and coins.

Although the statue is now lost, it was copied in marble by the Romans; one of the best surviving copies is in the Munich Glyptothek. It depicts the goddess carrying a child with her left arm—Plutus, the god of plenty and son of Demeter, the goddess of agriculture. Peace's missing right hand once held a sceptre. She is shown gazing maternally at Plutus, who is looking back at her trustingly. The statue is an allegory for Plenty (i.e., Plutus) prospering under the protection of Peace; it constituted a public appeal to good sense. The copy in the Glyptothek was originally in the collection of the Villa Albani in Rome but was looted and taken to France by Napoleon I. Following Napoleon's fall, the statue was bought by Ludwig I of Bavaria.

References

External links

Justice goddesses
Peace goddesses
Greek goddesses
Personifications in Greek mythology
Children of Zeus
Horae